Karl Karlstrand (3 January 1893 – 9 January 1942) was a Swedish footballer. Karlstrand was part of the Djurgården Swedish champions' team of 1915 and 1920. Karlstrand made eight appearances for Sweden and scored two goals.

Honours

Club 
 Djurgårdens IF 
 Svenska Mästerskapet (2): 1915, 1920

References

External links
 
 

Swedish footballers
Djurgårdens IF Fotboll players
Sweden international footballers
1893 births
1942 deaths
Association footballers not categorized by position